Cassie Brady is a fictional character from the NBC daytime soap opera, Days of Our Lives. Cassie and her twin brother Rex first appeared in Salem after a Fourth of July meteor shower in 2002 and were believed to be aliens. They are later revealed to be the children of Roman Brady and Kate Roberts.

Casting
Created by Peter Brash and Paula Quickly, the role of Cassie was cast with Alexis Thorpe, who had previously portrayed Rianna Miner on The Young and the Restless. Thorpe appeared as a contract player from July 8, 2002, to December 1, 2003, at which point the character was believed to have been murdered. However, she reappeared on April 27, 2004, alive and well, making infrequent appearances until June 7, 2005, without a proper exit.

Storylines 
Cassie and her twin brother, Rex, crash-landed in Salem during a meteor shower and were originally believed to be aliens. The twins had matching tattoos resembling the Phoenix, which called their connection to Stefano DiMera and John Black into question. As time went on, they were then believed to be the children of Tony DiMera and Marlena Evans, who were taken away as toddlers and genetically manipulated by Stefano's scientific genius, Wilhelm Rolf. This was proven false. In reality, a sperm sample had been stolen from Roman Brady during his years as Stefano's captive and combined with eggs taken from Kate Roberts.

At first, Cassie pursues and eventually kisses Shawn-Douglas Brady, unaware that he is her cousin. Cassie then becomes involved with Lucas Roberts, unaware that he is her half-brother, almost sleeping with him before learning of their relationship. The twins keep their true parentage secret for a while in hopes of joining the DiMera family. Soon after their secret is revealed publicly, Cassie is killed by the "Salem Stalker" and her stabbed body is staged inside a Thanksgiving piñata. Kate is arrested after being found holding a bloody knife, but the real killer was a mind-controlled Marlena. Months later, Cassie and the other victims are found alive on a remote island, "Melaswen," in a recreation of Salem. Shortly after returning to the real Salem, Cassie is last seen leaving the main floor of the Brady Pub to go upstairs. It is later revealed that she has moved to Chicago. When Rex returns in 2018, he reveals that she is single.

Source link
soapcentral.com|DAYS Online
Cassie at soapcentral.com

References

Days of Our Lives characters
Fictional twins
Television characters introduced in 2002
American female characters in television
Fictional characters incorrectly presumed dead
Roberts family (Days of Our Lives)
Brady family (Days of Our Lives)